Eka Santika is an Indonesian former professional football player.

Club career

Persib 
In 2003, he was a part of the Persib squad that won 2-1 against Semarang.

Sriwijaya
When playing for Sriwijaya, he scored in the Copa Indonesia (currently Piala Indonesia).

Persikab 
On 6 August 2008, Eka Santika agreed to personal terms with Persikab and the club confirmed that it had signed Eka Santika on a loan.

Balikpapan 
Eka Santika completed his move to Persiba on 7 August 2010, on a year contract. He was handed the number 37 shirt.

He made his debut at August 28, 2010 in the Indonesian Inter Island Cup match against Sriwijaya. He came in as a substitute at 58th minute, replacing Eki Nurhakim, and scored his first pre-season goal for the club.

Career statistics

All competitions

Note: Prior to 2008, Premier Division was the top flight football league in Indonesia before being relegated to second level after the establishment of Indonesia Super League in 2008

References

Indonesian footballers
1982 births
Living people
Liga 1 (Indonesia) players
People from Sumedang
Association football forwards
Persiba Balikpapan players